Place of Skulls may refer to:

 Golgotha
 Place of Skulls (Moscow), a circular stone platform in Red Square.
 Place of Skulls (band), a doom metal band from Knoxville, Tennessee.